The compilation album Chosen Few II: El Documental, consists of two discs with 17 tracks each, produced by EMI Televisa Music and released in 2006.

Track listing
Disc One: Classics
 This Is the Chosen Few - Boy Wonder, Divino, Zion & Lennox, Yaga & Mackie, Voltio, TNT, LDA, Don Omar, Amaro, Plan B, Bimbo, Cheka, Don Dinero, Jowell & Randy, Ro-K, Getto, Reychesta Secret Weapon, Varón, Chingo Bling, Notch
 Ooh Ahh - L.D.A
 Hello Mama - Hector "El Father" feat. Yomo
 Atrevete - Wisin & Yandel feat. Franco "El Gorila"
 Una Mano Lava la Otra - Pitbull feat. Alexis & Fido
 Frikitona - Plan B
 Te Invitan al Party - L.D.A feat. Zion & Lennox
 No Voy a Parar - Jowell y Randy
 Intro - Alejandro Sanz
 No Es lo Mismo - Alejandro Sanz feat. Getto
 Mambo - Baby Ranks
 Me Encanta - Angel Doze
 Pase Lo Que Pase - Getto
 Uh-Oh - Angel & Khriz
 Vente Conmigo - Fuego
 No Me Digas Que Debo Hacer - Reychesta Secret Weapon
 Right Through - Manny Montes
Disc Two: More Classics
 Quiero Conocerte - R.K.M & Ken-Y
 Siente El Boom - Tito "El Bambino" feat. Randy
 Al Suelo - Yaviah
 Yo Soy el Mejor - Arcángel & De La Ghetto
 Te Va Llegar Tu Hora - N.O.R.E. feat. Big Mato
 Se Te Nota - Amaro feat. Chencho
 Dejame Hacerlo - Trebol Clan
 Intro - Stef la Kallejera
 Real Latinas - Mala Rodriguez, Orquidea Negra, La Bruja, Camil Y Ari Puelo
 Tu Me Entiendes - Getto
 Aqui Me Quedo - Notch
 Tu Tienes Que Entender - Joseph
 Me Gustan Todas (Chosen Few Remix) - Fuego feat. Reychesta Secret Weapon
 Revelacion (Chosen Few Remix) - Tempo feat. Getto & Reychesta Secret Weapon
 Hoy (Chosen Few Remix) - LDA feat. Cheka
 Frikitona (Chosen Few Remix) - Plan B feat. Trick Daddy, Trina, LDA
 Reggaeton Latino (Chosen Few Remix) - Don Omar feat. N.O.R.E., Fat Joe, L.D.A

Awards and nominations
 Lo Nuestro Award for Urban Album of the Year (nominated).

Sales and certifications

References

Reggaeton compilation albums
2006 compilation albums